"Doggy Dogg World" is the third and final single from American rapper Snoop Doggy Dogg's debut album, Doggystyle. It is the first European-only release with an American video TV-play. It features 1970s-era classic R&B and soul group the Dramatics, with guest rap verses from Kurupt and Daz Dillinger (Tha Dogg Pound). It samples Richard "Dimples" Fields' "If It Ain't One Thing, It's Another" from his 1982 album: Mr. Look So Good.  The song's title is a reference to a common eggcorn of the phrase "Dog-Eat-Dog World."

Music video 
The accompanying music video for "Doggy Dogg World" pays homage to the 1970s funk era as well as taking place during that time period, with several Blaxploitation film stars reprising their iconic film roles as guest appearances. The video also takes place at the now defunct Carolina West Nightclub in Los Angeles. The music video was released for the week ending on April 10, 1994.

Cast
 Snoop Doggy Dogg as "Silky Slim"
 The Dramatics as "The Fabulous Dramatics"
 Antonio Fargas as "Huggy Bear"
 Ricky Harris as "Taa Dow"
 Fred Berry as "Rerun"
 Fred Williamson as "The Hammer"
 Kurupt as "Small Change Willy from Philly"
 Dr. Dre as "Fortieth St Black"
 Rudy Ray Moore as "Dolemite"
 Pam Grier as "Foxy Brown"
 Daz Dillinger as "Sugafoot"
 Ron O'Neal as "Supa Fly"

Track listing 
12-inch single
 "Doggy Dogg World" (Perfecto mix) — 5:40
 "Doggy Dogg World" (LP version) — 5:04
 "Doggy Dogg World" (Dr. Dre radio edit) — 4:26
 "Doggy Dogg World" (Perfecto X-Rated mix) — 5:28
 Tracks 1 and 4 were remixed by Oakenfold.

Charts

References

External links 
 
 Rap Samples FAQ 

1993 songs
1994 singles
Eggcorns
Snoop Dogg songs
Song recordings produced by Dr. Dre
Songs written by Daz Dillinger
Songs written by Kurupt
Songs written by Snoop Dogg